Coenocalpe is a genus of moths in the family Geometridae erected by Jacob Hübner in 1825.

Species 
 Coenocalpe lapidata (Hübner, 1809) – slender-striped rufous
 Coenocalpe millierata (Staudinger, 1901)

References

External links 
 
 
 
 Coenocalpe at insectoid.info
 Coenocalpe at zipcodezoo.com
 
 

Melanthiini
Geometridae genera